SS Belanak was the fifth ship of the seven B-class oil tankers. She was previously known as Gouldia. She is named after belanak, a species of fish found in Brunei and Malaysia.

Development 
B-class oil tankers were built by CNIM-La Syne, France in 1972 to 1975. They served Gaz de France for around 14 years, the B-class vessels were acquired and delivered to BST in December 1986. Previously referred to as the G-class vessels chartered under Shell Tankers United Kingdom (STUK). They continued to provide reliable service to the company and its client especially BLNG. Four out of the seven BST vessels carry a fully Bruneian crew with the exception of senior management; a feat yet to be achieved but not impossible.

All B-class oil tankers were taken out of service in 2011. They are all steam powered.

Construction and career 
SS Gadinia was ordered in 1972 and completed in 1975. The vessel entered service in 1975 and was taken out of service to be sold in 1986. In 1986, Brunei Shell acquired Gouldia and renamed her Belanak. Throughout her career she routinely traveled between Brunei and Japan carrying oil.

On 28 April 2018, Belanak was taken out of service to be scrapped in Shanghai, China after 45 years of service. Her and her sister SS Bebatik were the last two in service.

References 

Ships of Brunei
Ships built in France
1974 ships